Accused is an American crime drama television series developed by Howard Gordon that is based on the 2010 British series of the same name. The series premiered on Fox on January 22, 2023.

Premise
The series chronicles ordinary people wherein each episode opens in a courtroom introducing the accused without knowing their crime or how they ended up on trial and we are told the events that lead them here from the defendant's point of view.

Episodes

Production
In May 2021, it was announced Fox had given a straight-to-series order to Accused produced by Howard Gordon, Alex Gansa and David Shore based on the 2010 BBC One series of the name. In November 2022, it was announced Accused would air as part of Fox's midseason schedule.

Reception

Critical response
The review aggregator website Rotten Tomatoes reported a 60% approval rating with an average rating of 7.3/10, based on 15 critic reviews. The website's critics consensus reads, "While Accused is yet another variation on a very familiar theme, its anthology structure offers enough flexibility and star power for some compelling courtroom stories." Metacritic, which uses a weighted average, assigned a score of 60 out of 100 based on 12 critics, indicating "mixed or average reviews".

Max Gao of The A.V. Club gave the series a B and said, "Offers a fresh take on the typical legal procedural." The Hollywood Reporter Angie Han wrote, "Without much insight to share, catharsis to offer or even a particularly interesting tone or style to grab us, Accused becomes just another so-so crime drama in an ocean teeming with them." Writing for The Wall Street Journal, John Anderson stated, "Accused may be out to provoke, but it scores more hits than misses. And its sins of indulgence are ultimately well-intended."

Ratings
The premiere episode had more than 11.3 million viewers and a 2.3 rating among the 18-49 demographic in the three days after its premiere on multi-platforms. It is the highest-rated and most-watched debut on Fox in 3 years.

References

External links
 
 

2020s American anthology television series
2020s American crime drama television series
2020s American legal television series
2023 American television series debuts
American legal drama television series
American television series based on British television series
English-language television shows
Fox Broadcasting Company original programming
Television series by All3Media
Television series by Fox Entertainment
Television series by Sony Pictures Television